Ufukhan Bayraktar (born 9 January 1986) is a Turkish professional footballer who most recently played as a right wingback for Vanspor FK.

Bayraktar is a former member of the Trabzonspor youth academy and has been capped at youth international levels.

References

External links

1986 births
Living people
Turkish footballers
Turkey under-21 international footballers
Trabzonspor footballers
Denizlispor footballers
Gaziantep F.K. footballers
Manisaspor footballers
Çaykur Rizespor footballers
Konyaspor footballers
Altay S.K. footballers
Karşıyaka S.K. footballers
Kayseri Erciyesspor footballers
Süper Lig players
Turkey youth international footballers
TFF First League players
Association football defenders
People from Arsin, Turkey